Mrva (feminine: Mrvová) is a Slovak surname. Notable people with the surname include:

Alena Mrvová (born 1978), Slovak chess grandmaster
Mário Mrva (born 1999), Slovak footballer
Martin Mrva (born 1971), Slovak chess grandmaster
Tomáš Mrva (born 1989), Slovak footballer

Slovak-language surnames